Damir Grgić is a Slovenian basketball coach of the Slovenian national team, which he coached at the EuroBasket Women 2017 and 2021 in France (Strasbourg).

References

1979 births
Living people
Slovenian basketball coaches
Place of birth missing (living people)
21st-century Slovenian people